Rakestraw is a surname. Notable people with the surname include:

Frederick Rakestraw (1923–2004), Justice of the Indiana Supreme Court
Larry Rakestraw (born 1942), American football player
Paulette Rakestraw (born 1967), American politician from the state of Georgia
Wilbur Rakestraw (1928–2014), American racing driver

See also
Rakestraw House, a historic home located near Garrett in Keyser Township, DeKalb County, Indiana.

English-language surnames